Gunmen from Laredo is a 1959 American Western film produced and directed by Wallace MacDonald, which stars Robert Knapp, Jana Davi and Walter Coy.

Cast list
 Robert Knapp as Gil Reardon
 Jana Davi as Rosita
 Walter Coy as Ben Keefer
 Paul Birch as Matt Crawford
 Don C. Harvey as Dave Marlow
 Clarence Straight as Frank Bass
 Jerry Barclay as Jordan Keefer
 Ron Hayes as Walt Keefer
 Charles Horvath as Coloradas
 Jean Moorhead as Katy Reardon
 X Brands as Delgados
 Harry Antrim as Judge Raymond Parker
 Bob Cason as Bob Sutton
 Hank Patterson as Stableman
 Dan White as Jury foreman
 Joseph Breen as Walker
 Bill Hale as Dodge
 Gil Perkins as Bowdrie
 Larry Thor as Capt. Garrick
 Don Blackman as Smoky
 Martin Garralaga as Fierro

References

External links
 
 
 

Columbia Pictures films
1959 Western (genre) films
1959 films
American Western (genre) films
1950s English-language films
1950s American films